Couse is a surname, and may refer to:

 Dave Couse, Irish singer and songwriter
 E. Irving Couse (1866–1936), American artist
 Kenton Couse (1721–1790), British architect